The short-eared bat (Cyttarops alecto) is a bat species found in Brazil, Costa Rica, Guyana and Nicaragua.  It is the only species within its genus.

Description
The short-eared bat is a dark-colored sac-winged bat, similar in appearance to Saccopteryx or Peropteryx, but differentiated by its long, silky fur, low rounded ears, expanded clavicles, grooved tibia, and cranial frontal cup. Females tend to be somewhat larger than males. As with all emballonurid bats, short-eared bats use a type of echolocation call that consists of a central, narrowband component and one or two short, frequency-modulated sweeps. All calls are multi-harmonic with most energy concentrated in the second harmonic.

Range and population
The currently known range of this species extends from the Caribbean lowlands of Costa Rica through Guyana to the state of Para, Brazil and it has never been found in elevations below . The exact population size of the short-eared bat is unknown, but this is one of the rarest Neotropical bats, known from fewer than twenty individuals taken from less than ten localities in humid lowland areas. They face no immediate threats and are listed as being of Least Concern by the IUCN.

Behavior
Aerial insectivores, Cyttarops alecto roosts in small groups of one to ten individuals of both sexes and mixed ages under fronds of coco palms during the day.  It hangs freely by the feet when roosting near the midrib of a frond. They are nocturnal so activity doesn't usually start until about 45 min after sunset and is usually restricted to the immediate area around the roost for the first 15 to 30 min.  Once it is completely dark, individuals disperse, flying at least 3 to 4 m above ground. Roosts are often located in exposed places and even by buildings actively occupied by humans, demonstrating they can be adaptable to human-disturbed areas.

References

Bats of South America
Bats of Central America
Bats of Brazil
Mammals of Colombia
Emballonuridae
Mammals described in 1913
Taxa named by Oldfield Thomas